Óscar Plano Pedreño (born 11 February 1991) is a Spanish professional footballer who plays for Real Valladolid as an attacking midfielder.

Club career

Real Madrid
Born in Madrid, Plano joined Real Madrid's academy at the age of 11. He made his Segunda División debut with the reserves during the 2012–13 season, scoring four goals for the eighth-placed team.

Plano's first match as a professional took place on 17 August 2012, when he featured 68 minutes in a 2–1 away loss against Villarreal CF B.

Alcorcón
On 2 September 2013, Plano was loaned to AD Alcorcón for the upcoming campaign. On 29 July 2014, he signed a permanent two-year contract.

Plano netted a career-best nine times in 2015–16 (second-best in the squad, only behind David Rodríguez's 19), helping the side once again retain their second-tier status.

Valladolid
On 3 July 2017, free agent Plano joined Real Valladolid on a two-year deal. He contributed four goals in 40 matches in his first season, as the club returned to La Liga after a four-year absence.

Plano took his bow in the Spanish top flight on 17 August 2018, coming on as a second-half substitute in the 0–0 draw away to Girona FC.

Career statistics

Notes

References

External links

1991 births
Living people
Spanish footballers
Footballers from Madrid
Association football forwards
La Liga players
Segunda División players
Segunda División B players
Tercera División players
Real Madrid C footballers
Real Madrid Castilla footballers
AD Alcorcón footballers
Real Valladolid players